Smerinthus is a Holarctic genus of hawkmoths in the family Sphingidae. It was described by Pierre André Latreille in 1802. Adults have conspicuous eyespots on the hindwings.

Species
Smerinthus astarte Strecker, [1885]
Smerinthus caecus Menetries, 1857
Smerinthus cerisyi Kirby, 1837
Smerinthus jamaicensis (Drury, 1773)
Smerinthus kindermannii Lederer, 1853
Smerinthus minor Mell, 1937
Smerinthus ocellatus (Linnaeus, 1758)
Smerinthus ophthalmica Boisduval, 1855
Smerinthus planus Walker, 1856
Smerinthus saliceti Boisduval, 1875
Smerinthus szechuanus (Clark, 1938)
Smerinthus tokyonis Matsumura, 1921
Smerinthus visinskasi Zolotuhin & Saldaitis, 2009

Nomenclatural note

The name Smerinthus is apparently derived from the Greek feminine noun 'Merinthos', but has been Latinised with the masculine -us ending and is thus, according to the ICZN article 30.1.3, masculine. As the ICZN rules that species names that are adjectives should agree in gender with the genus name, the common use of Smerinthus ocellata for the widespread European species Smerinthus ocellatus is incorrect.

References 

 
Smerinthini
Moth genera
Taxa named by Pierre André Latreille